This article is about the 2006 season of the Crusaders in the National League Two, Challenge Cup & Northern Rail Cup competitions.

Squad

Squad 

League Results

Play-Off Results

Play-Off Results

Challenge Cup Results

Statistics 

Tries

Goals

Points

Appearances

References

Crusaders Rugby League seasons
Celtic Crusaders season
2006 in Welsh rugby league